The Kabui people (also known as the Inpui people or the Rongmei people), are a Tibeto-Burman indigenous ethnic group in the Northeast Indian state of Manipur. They are politically categorised as a part of the Naga people of North-East India. They are recognised as a scheduled tribe (STs) by the Constitution of India.

Some historians and anthropologists have earlier recorded them as Kabui along with Rongmei. The Inpuis are the original Kabuis and not Rongmei. The origin of the term can be traced to Inpui. They are listed as a Scheduled Tribe, in accordance with The Scheduled Castes and Scheduled Tribes Orders (Amendment) Act, 1976 Indian Constitution. They celebrate festivals like Karing-ngei, Somdungnu, Tataaknu, and Muliaang.

Eventually, under the leadership of Haipou Jadonang and his successor Rani Gaidinliu, the Rongmei rebelled against British rule in the 1930s. This rebellion gave momentum to and garnered support for the vision of Naga Raj.

Notable people 
 Alana Golmei
 Grace Dangmei
 Gaikhangam Gangmei
 Gangmumei Kamei
 Haipou Jadonang
 Jiangam Kamei
 Meijinlung Kamson
 Rani Gaidinliu
 Rachunliu G. Kamei

See also 
Hill tribes of Northeast India
Nagaland
Tamenglong
Zeliangrong
List of Naga tribes

References

External links
www.nambon.com - Zeliangrong community information

Scheduled Tribes of Manipur
Naga people
Ethnic groups in Northeast India
Ethnic groups in South Asia